Robert Solli Burås (12 August 1975 – 12 July 2007) was guitarist and songwriter in the Norwegian rock band Madrugada. He was also a founding member of the band My Midnight Creeps, where he played guitar and was lead singer.

On 12 July 2007, Burås was found dead in his apartment by a friend, with his guitar in his hand. After a ceremony in Sofienberg Church in Oslo, he was cremated. His ashes lie at Bjerkvik Cemetery in Nordland, Norway.

Early life
According to a radio interview with NRK disc jockey Harald Are Lund in 2006, Robert Burås' first real contact with rock music came in the form of a mix tape. The first song on the tape was Led Zeppelin's Rock and Roll, and 12-year-old Robert was hooked. In later years, he mentioned Rock and Roll as a favourite of his.

Madrugada

After playing in local bands with friends and schoolmates in his adolescent years, he formed Abby's Adoption with drummer John Lauvland Pettersen and bass player Frode Jacobsen. The three teamed up with singer Sivert Høyem, changed their name to Madrugada and relocated to Oslo shortly after that. Madrugada's debut EP was released in 1998.

My Midnight Creeps

Robert Burås founded My Midnight Creeps in 2005 in which he performed as lead singer/guitarist as well as fronting the band and writing the majority of the material. They released two albums: the eponymous My Midnight Creeps (2005) and Histamin (2007).

Instruments
Burås' instrument of choice throughout his career with Madrugada was a 1966 vintage, Candy Apple Red, Fender Jazzmaster.  This guitar was placed on top of the coffin during his funeral service.  Also used extensively were his sunburst Fender Stratocaster, black Gibson Les Paul Custom and in later times with My Midnight Creeps he performed mostly with a brown Gibson ES-345.  He also played the Harmonica, electric mandolin and occasionally piano.

References

External links
Official Madrugada homepage
 

1975 births
2007 deaths
Norwegian rock guitarists
Musicians from Narvik
20th-century guitarists